Nadezhdiella is a genus of beetles belonging to the family of Cerambycidae, subfamily Cerambycinae.

Species 

 Nadezhdiella cantori (Hope, 1834)
 Nadezhdiella fulvopubens (Pic, 1933)
 Nadezhdiella japonica (Hayashi, 1972)
 Nadezhdiella spadix (Holzschuh, 2005)

References 

Cerambycini
Cerambycidae genera